Zuyakovo (Yöyäk) is a rural locality (a selo) and the administrative centre of Zuyakovsky Selsoviet, Beloretsky District, Bashkortostan, Russia. The population was 849 as of 2010. There are 10 streets.

Geography 
Zuyakovo is located 132 km northwest of Beloretsk (the district's administrative centre) by road. Brishtamak is the nearest rural locality.

References 

Rural localities in Beloretsky District